The 2022–23 St. John's Red Storm women's basketball team represent St. John's University during the 2022–23 NCAA Division I women's basketball season. The Red Storm, led by eleventh-year head coach Joe Tartamella, play their games at Carnesecca Arena and are members of the Big East Conference.

Previous season 

The Red Storm finished the season at 12–19 and 7–12 in Big East play to finish in seventh place. They defeated Xavier in the first round of the Big East women's tournament before losing to Villanova in the quarterfinals.

Offseason

Departures

Incoming transfers

Recruiting
There were no recruiting classing class of 2022.

Roster

Schedule

|-
!colspan=9 style=| Regular season

|-
!colspan=9 style=| Big East Women's Tournament

|-
!colspan=9 style=| NCAA tournament

Rankings

*The preseason and week 1 polls were the same.^Coaches did not release a week 2 poll.

References

St. John's
St. John's Red Storm women's basketball seasons
Saint John's
Saint John's
St. John's